Nélson Couto e Silva Marques Lisboa, commonly known as Nélson Couto (17 April 1930 – 30 October 2020), was a Brazilian basketball player. He competed in the men's tournament at the 1956 Summer Olympics.

References

1930 births
2020 deaths
Brazilian men's basketball players
Olympic basketball players of Brazil
Basketball players at the 1956 Summer Olympics
Sportspeople from Belo Horizonte
20th-century Brazilian people